The 2010 Uzbekistan First League  was the 19th season of 2nd level football in Uzbekistan since 1992.

Teams and locations

Competition format

League consists of 16 teams which play on regular home-and-away schedule: each team plays the other teams twice. The top two teams of the promote to Uzbek top league.

League table
The final standings of teams after last matchday. FK Buxoro and Sogdiana Jizzakh promoted to Oliy Liga.

Top goalscorers

Last updated: October 28, 2010
Source: Uzbekistan First League

References

External links
Championat.uz: Standings and results
pfl.uz: First league results
Soccerway.com; Standings, Fixtures & Results

Uzbekistan Pro League seasons
2
Uzbek
Uzbek

uz:O'zbekiston Professional Futbol Ligasining 1-Liga Sharq Mintaqasi